Sagartiidae is a family of sea anemones.

Genera
Genera in the family include:

 Actinothoe Fischer, 1889
 Anthothoe Carlgren, 1938
 Artemidactis Stephenson, 1918
 Botryon Carlgren & Hedgepeth, 1952
 Cancrisocia
 Carcinactis
 Cereus Oken, 1815
 Gregoria
 Habrosanthus
 Octophellia
 Sagartia Gosse, 1855
 Sagartiogeton Carlgren, 1924
 Sicyopus Gravier, 1918
 Verrillactis

References

 
Cnidarian families
Taxa named by Philip Henry Gosse
Metridioidea